Taekwondo at the 2005 Southeast Asian Games were held in the Cuneta Astrodome in Roxas Boulevard, Pasay, Metro Manila, Philippines. The participants competed for one of sixteen gold medals, eight each for men and women.

Medal table

Medalists

Men

Women

See also
Taekwondo in the Philippines

External links
Southeast Asian Games Official Results

2005 Southeast Asian Games events
Southeast Asian Games
2005